Ingalls is a surname of Scottish origin and a placename deriving from the Latin term 'anglicus' referring to a person being from England, and may refer to:

People

Given name
 Ingalls Kimball (1874–1933), American printer and entrepreneur

Surname
 Albert Graham Ingalls (1888–1958), former editor of Scientific American and amateur telescope-making enthusiast
 Barbara Ingalls Shook (1938–2008), American philanthropist from Birmingham, Alabama
 Bob Ingalls (1919-1970), American football player and coach
 Bret Ingalls (born 1960), American football coach
 Caroline Ingalls (1839-1924), mother of author Laura Ingalls Wilder
 Carrie Ingalls (1870-1946), younger sister of author Laura Ingalls Wilder
 Charles Ingalls (1836-1902), father of author Laura Ingalls Wilder
 Daniel Henry Holmes Ingalls, Jr. (born 1944), an American pioneer of object-oriented computer programming and principal architect, designer and implementer of five generations of Smalltalk environments
 Daniel H. H. Ingalls, Sr. (1916–1999), Professor of Sanskrit at Harvard University
 David Sinton Ingalls (1899–1985), American businessman, politician and first flying ace in US Navy history
 Don Ingalls (1918-2014), American screenwriter and television producer
 Edmund Ingalls (c. 1598–1648), founder of Lynn, Massachusetts
 Eliza Buckley Ingalls (1848–1918), American temperance activist
 George Alan Ingalls (1946-1967), American soldier posthumously awarded the Medal of Honor
 George L. Ingalls (1914–2001), New York politician
 Grace Ingalls (1877-1941), younger sister of author Laura Ingalls Wilder
 James Monroe Ingalls (1837–1927), American soldier and ballistics authority
 Jeremiah Ingalls (1764–1838), one of the first American composers
 John James Ingalls (1833–1900), Republican member of Kansas state legislature and U.S. Senator from Kansas
 Joshua K. Ingalls (1816–1898), inventor, land reformer, and anarchist theorist
 Laura Ingalls (disambiguation), several people
 Mary Ingalls (1865-1928), older sister of author Laura Ingalls Wilder
 Melville E. Ingalls (1842–1914), American politician and railroad president
 Rachel Ingalls (1940–2019), American-born author living in the UK
 Robert Ingersoll Ingalls, Sr. (1882–1951), American businessman and philanthropist
 Rufus Ingalls (1818–1893), US Army general and Quartermaster General
 Sheffield Ingalls (1875–1937), American banker, attorney and politician, 20th Lieutenant Governor of Kansas
 Wallace Ingalls (1859–1936), American lawyer and politician
 Wilbur R. Ingalls, Jr. (1923-1997), American architect

Places

United States
 Ingalls, Arkansas, an unincorporated community
 Ingalls, Indiana. a town
 Ingalls Township, Gray County, Kansas
 Ingalls, Kansas, a city in the township
 Ingalls, Michigan, an unincorporated community
 Ingalls, Missouri, a ghost town
 Ingalls, North Carolina, an unincorporated community
 Ingalls, Oklahoma, a ghost town
 Lake Ingalls, Washington
 Mount Ingalls (California)

Elsewhere
 Ingalls (crater), on the Moon
 Ingalls Head, New Brunswick, Locality on the Island of Grand Manan, New Brunswick

Buildings
 Ingalls Building, Cincinnati, Ohio, the world's first reinforced concrete skyscraper
 Ingalls Memorial Hospital, Harvey, Illinois
 Ingalls House (disambiguation)
 Ingalls Rink, a hockey rink owned by Yale University in New Haven, Connecticut

Other uses
 Ingalls Shipbuilding, now part of Northrop Grumman Ship Systems
 Albert Quinn Ingalls, a fictional character in the TV series Little House on the Prairie
 Jane Ingalls, a fictional character in the TV series Orange is the New Black

See also
 Ingall (surname)
 Ingles (surname)